Kirsten Ulve (born 1967) is a graphic artist who resides in New York City. She is best known for her caricatures of notable people and editorial illustration for newspapers and magazines. Ulve has also designed for an array of other mediums including a marquee for Broadway and stamps for the United States Post Office. Kirsten is married to WFMU radio personality Clay Pigeon.

Early life and education 

Ulve was born in 1967 and grew up in Dubuque, Iowa. Her mother, Charlotte Ulve, taught at Loras College and was involved in the local arts community. Her father, Edward Ulve, was a certified public accountant. She studied drawing and graphic design at the University of Iowa School of Art and Art History, where she also worked at the school’s in house graphic design studio. After graduating, she spent 6 years in Chicago working as a graphic designer and illustrator before moving to New York City to pursue illustration full time.

Career 

Cindy Nelson of Dubuque Museum of Art said in 2020, "Kirsten’s story should be a blueprint for how young people in our schools could pursue their dreams in the art world."

Ulve is known for caricatures of notable people and has illustrated for many mediums including newspapers, magazines, animation, children's clothing, silk scarves and games. Some of her print clients include: The New York Times, Vogue Japan, The Los Angeles Times, Politico, The New Yorker, Glamour , Boston Magazine, Hasbro, DMagazine, Godiva, Fast Company, Harvard Business Review, Los Angeles Magazine, The Hollywood Reporter, Variety, and Entertainment Weekly.

In 2011, Ulve created the animated characters and figurines for Hasbro’s Littlest Pet Shop. In 2019, Ulve created fine art that is displayed at the INNSIDE New York NoMad in New York City. During May 2020, Ulve was asked to create Game of Thrones characters in Skyrim’s character creator for Ars Technica. In September 2020, she created illustrations for the annual USPS holiday stamp collection.

Ulve frequently makes the American Illustrator Annual edition.

She has also participated in the following shows and projects:

 Girls, Girls, Girls (with artist Fafi) Sixspace Gallery in Los Angeles, 2003
 Pictures You Will Like! (solo show) Gallery Lele, Tokyo, 2005
 Pictures You Will Like! (solo show) Gallery Hanahou, NYC, 2007
 Prints and Pages (group show) Gallery Hanahou, NYC, 2011
Project Angel Food's GET ART, Los Angeles, CA, 2013
 Explorers against Extinction, 2020
 Best Friends Animal Society, 2020

Critical reception 
Ulve has been favorably reviewed by critics. Grace Bonney of Design Sponge said,
 

The staff of Entertainment Weekly wrote,

Sarah Strong of Downtown Magazine said of Ulve's installations at the INNSIDE by Meliá New York Hotel,

External links 

 Kirstenulve.com

References 

American women artists
University of Iowa alumni
Graphic artists
1967 births
Living people
21st-century American women